Acceptance Speech is the fifth studio album by American rock band Dance Gavin Dance, released on October 8, 2013, on Rise Records. The album serves as a follow-up to the band's fourth studio album, Downtown Battle Mountain II (2011), and is the band's first studio album to feature clean vocalist Tilian Pearson, bass guitarist Tim Feerick, and guitarist Josh Benton. It is the band's only studio album to feature Benton on rhythm guitar, who departed shortly after the album's release. The album was produced by Matt Malpass, which marks the band's first and only studio album to not be produced by Kris Crummett, who has produced all of the band's previous releases since Whatever I Say Is Royal Ocean (2006).

The album was announced on July 18, 2013. It was supported by the lead single, "The Robot with Human Hair, Pt. 4", released on July 19, 2013. The promotional single, the title-track "Acceptance Speech", was released on September 16. The second promotional single, "Jesus H. Macy", was released on September 30. The band released a music video for "Strawberry Swisher, Pt. 3" on October 31. Another music video, for "Death of the Robot with Human Hair", premiered on March 7, 2014. The band released a B-side track, titled "Pussy Vultures", a song from the recording sessions for the album, on September 22, 2014. They toured on the Acceptance Speech Tour and the Rise Records Tour in 2014 to promote the album. On August 30, 2019, the band released an instrumental and a remastered version of the album, Acceptance Speech 2.0, to streaming and digital download platforms.

Track listing

Notes
 Acceptance Speech features the most song title sequels in one studio album in the band's entire career, having 4 sequels ("The Robot with Human Hair, Pt. 4", "Strawberry Swisher, Pt. 3", "Death of the Robot with Human Hair", and "Turn Off the Lights, I'm Watching Back to the Future, Pt. II").
 "Pussy Vultures" is not featured on the standard release of the album and was instead released as a single.
 "Acceptance Speech" and "Death of the Robot with Human Hair" feature additional vocals from Will Swan.

Critical reception
The album received mixed to positive reviews from critics, with praise being directed towards certain aspects of the album. However, Tilian Pearson's vocals received lukewarm reviews, along with the unique mix of genres. Deadpress concluded their review by saying "what we have here is a refreshing DGD who’ve managed to maintain their identity regardless, and maybe we’ll also have a consistent line-up for the foreseeable future" and gave the album a rating of eight out of ten.

Criticism was leveled against the production and lyrical content, as Adam Thomas from sputnikmusic went on to say "...but at the end of the day Mess' lyrical prowess is so far beyond hit or miss that it is just absurd."

Personnel
Dance Gavin Dance
 Tilian Pearson – clean vocals
 Jon Mess – unclean vocals
 Will Swan – guitar, backing vocals, rapping (on "Acceptance Speech" & 	"Death of the Robot with Human Hair")
 Josh Benton – guitar
 Tim Feerick – bass
 Matt Mingus – drums, percussion

Production
 Matt Malpass – production, engineering, mixing
 Kris Crummett – mastering
 Mattias Adolfsson - artwork
 Additional guitar by Martin Bianchini
 Management by Eric Rushing
 Booking by Jeremy Holgerson

Chart performance

Acceptance Speech 2.0

Acceptance Speech 2.0 is a remaster of American rock band Dance Gavin Dance's fifth studio album, Acceptance Speech (2013), released on August 30, 2019, on Rise Records. The remaster coincides with the release of the instrumental version of the album. It was originally produced by Matt Malpass while the remaster was engineered by producer Kris Crummett.

Background

On May 31, 2019, Dance Gavin Dance released an instrumental version of their eighth studio album, Artificial Selection. The band began a pattern of releasing an instrumental version of their albums on the last Friday of every month since, with Mothership (2016), being released on June 28 and Instant Gratification (2015), on July 26.

In April 2019, vocalist Tilian Pearson revealed that a remastered version of the band's fifth studio album Acceptance Speech (2013), was completed and would be released the same year. On August 29, it was confirmed that a remastered and an instrumental version of the album would be released the following day.

Track listing

Credits and personnel

Dance Gavin Dance
 Tilian Pearson – clean vocals
 Jon Mess – unclean vocals
 Will Swan – guitar, backing vocals, rapping (on tracks 3, 9)
 Josh Benton – guitar
 Tim Feerick – bass
 Matt Mingus – drums, percussion

Production
 Matt Malpass – production, engineering
 Kris Crummett – mastering, mixing
 Mattias Adolfsson – artwork
 Martin Bianchini – additional guitar
 Eric Rushing – management
 Jeremy Holgerson – booking

References

External links

2013 albums
Dance Gavin Dance albums
Rise Records albums